Ernest Levitt (2 April 1893 – December 1979) was an English professional footballer who played as a centre half in the Football League for Brentford.

Career 
Born in the northeast of England, Levitt began his career in Scotland with Dundee. He returned home to Silksworth to play for the village team and was signed by Third Division club Brentford in June 1920. Levitt made six appearances at the beginning of the 1920–21 season, but lost his place in the team to Alf Amos and had his contract cancelled in December 1920. He returned to the northeast and played for non-League clubs West Stanley, Thornley Albion and Wingate Albion.

Career statistics

References

1893 births
English footballers
People from the City of Sunderland
Footballers from Tyne and Wear
Dundee F.C. players
Brentford F.C. players
English Football League players
West Stanley F.C. players
Association football central defenders
Scottish Football League players
1979 deaths